Maheshwar Panta or  Maheshwor Pant (Nepali: महेश्वर पन्त) was the teacher and later Army Chief of King Prithvi Narayan Shah (1723–1775 AD).
With Bhanu Aryal, he trained King Prithvi Narayan. When Biraj Thapa Magar failed to attack Nuwakot, he with Kalu Pandey was sent to attack Nuwakot. Both Panta and Pandey failed respectively and Prithvi Narayan Shah began training.

References

Year of birth missing
Year of death missing
Nepalese military personnel
People from Gorkha District